Greyia is a genus of plant in family Francoaceae. It contains three species:
 Greyia flanaganii, Bolus
 Greyia radlkoferi
 Greyia sutherlandii

Unlike other plants sometimes included in the family Melianthaceae, Greyia has simple (undivided) leaves, flowers with ten stamens, and ovaries with parietal placentation.  Because of this, the genus has sometimes been placed in a separate family Greyiaceae, but under the APG II system and APG III system of classification, it was included in the Melianthaceae. Under the APG IV system, it is included in the Francoaceae.

References

 
Geraniales genera
Taxonomy articles created by Polbot